Claire Williams may refer to:

People
 Claire Williams Harris (born 1976; as Claire Williams) team leader of Formula One team Williams Racing
 Claire Williams (athlete) (born 1987) Paralympian for Wales
 Ann Claire Williams (born 1949) United States circuit judge
 Julia Claire Williams (pageant princess), 2016 awardee at the Miss Louisiana's Outstanding Teen
 Colette Claire Williams (politician) for the Respect Party, who ran in the 2014 Manchester City Council election
 Claire Williams (actress), actress noted for performing with animated characters in 1977
 Claire Williams (soccer), footballer for the Millwall Lionesses in the 2005–06 FA Women's Premier League

Fictional characters
 Claire Williams (Fringe character), a fictional character from The Fringe 2008 season 2 number 6 episode "The Cure" (Fringe)
 Claire Williams (Diamond Horseshoe character), a fictional character portrayed by Beatrice Kay from 1945 film Diamond Horseshoe
 Claire Williams (Voices character), a fictional character from the 1973 horror film Voices (1973 film)

See also

 claire (disambiguation)
 williams (disambiguation)